Croydon Hills is a suburb of Melbourne, Victoria, Australia, 26 km east of Melbourne's Central Business District, located within the City of Maroondah local government area. Croydon Hills recorded a population of 4,839 at the 2021 census.

Croydon Hills is bounded by Plymouth Road to the south, Yarra Road to the east and Bemboka Road to the west. The suburb is located in the outer east of Melbourne.

Approximately 5,600 people live in Croydon Hills, with the majority of household incomes between the $50k-80k and $80k-$100k mark.

The suburb was formerly mixed use farmland and orchards. It was developed into spacious suburban housing during the 1980s. The architectural style is typically single storey, brick veneer, with large allotments affording both front and rear gardens, as well as off-street parking for several vehicles.

Croydon Hills has many parks, with walking tracks and native bushlands, such as Settlers Orchard, Yarrunga Reserve, Candlebark Walk and Narr-Maen Reserve. Native birds such as the kookaburra, magpie, galah, sulphur crested cockatoo, magpie-lark, purple swamphen, Eurasian coot, Pacific black duck and Australian wood duck are a common sight in both the parklands and backyard gardens. The common brushtail possum inhabits the area.

Croydon Hills has several churches located in the suburb as well, including Baptist, Anglican and Presbyterian.

The nearest shopping areas are McAdam Square and Burnt Bridge. McAdam Square has a few different shops such as cafes, a Jefferies supermarket, a fruit and vegetable shop, take-away shops, a travel shop, and a newsagency and post office.

The Yarrunga Community Centre is at 76–86 Croydon Hills Drive, in Yarrunga Reserve, adjacent to Croydon Hills Primary School.

Education

A number of primary and secondary schools are well established in the surrounding Croydon and Ringwood North suburbs and thus the area is popular with young families.

There are three schools in Croydon Hills:
 Croydon Hills Primary School
 Good Shepherd Lutheran Primary School
 Luther College

Schools in surrounding areas include Yarra Valley Grammar, Melbourne Rudolf Steiner School, and Croydon Primary School.

Public transport
The nearest train station is the Croydon railway station. There are few facilities within easy walking distance and most inhabitants rely on motor vehicles.

Buses in Croydon Hills are limited to the following route:
 380 Ringwood – Croydon via Croydon Hills (every day). Operated by Ventura Bus Lines. This route operates between Ringwood and Croydon railway stations, via Croydon Hills.

Notable people
 360 (rapper) – attended Luther College, Croydon
 Matthew Haanappel- Paralympic Swimmer lived in the Croydon Hills area during his childhood.
 Aaron Baddeley – attended Luther College, Croydon

See also
 City of Croydon – Croydon Hills was previously within this former local government area.

References

External links
 Australian Places – Croydon
 Yarrunga Community Centre

Suburbs of Melbourne
Suburbs of the City of Maroondah